Joseph Isaac Gnanamuttu (died 19 January 1944) was a Ceylon Tamil politician and member of the State Council of Ceylon. 

Gnanamuttu contested the 1943 State Council by-election as a candidate in Mannar-Mullaitivu and was elected to the State Council of Ceylon. He died on 19 January 1944.

References

1944 deaths
Members of the 2nd State Council of Ceylon
People from British Ceylon
Sri Lankan Tamil politicians
Year of birth missing